"Long live our noble Duke" is an alteration traditionally made within the historic county boundaries of Lancashire to the anthem "God Save the King". The anthem still uses the same lyrics and instrumental tune, but the second line "Long live our noble King" is changed to "Long live our noble Duke" out of respect to the reigning monarch in their capacity as Duke of Lancaster. The title is always held by the monarch as head of the royal Duchy of Lancaster, historically Lancaster being the county town of Lancashire. No matter if the sovereign is male or female, they always retain the style of duke, therefore the variant second line never changes even if "God save the Queen" changes to "God save the King" and vice versa.

An unofficial Lancashire anthem, it is often used at formal dinners in the historical county and in Lancastrian regiments of the armed forces. This version of the anthem is used every Sunday at the Savoy Chapel which is governed by the Duchy of Lancaster. Another version recorded to have been used at the Savoy Chapel is "God save our Duke the King, Long Live our noble Duke", this being in 1951 when King George VI was monarch. The variant alters lines 1 and 2 in the original national lyrics.

It is still currently used by Old Boys of Lancaster Royal Grammar School.

Lyrics

See also
Lancashire
Lancashire Day
God Save the King

Notes

References

British anthems
British monarchy
British patriotic songs